Vicente Suárez de Deza y Ávila was a Spanish playwright of the Siglo de Oro.

References

Date of birth unknown
Date of death unknown
Year of birth unknown
Year of death unknown
Spanish writers